The Pink Diamond is a 1926 German silent comedy-drama film directed by Rochus Gliese and starring Xenia Desni, Rudolf Klein-Rogge and William Dieterle. It was based on the play Karriere by Richard Kepler. The film's sets were designed by Egon Eiermann. It premiered on 8 March 1926.

Cast
Xenia Desni as Nelly
Rudolf Klein-Rogge as Stuart, Theater director
William Dieterle as Tobian
Ginette Maddie as Bessie
Hans Rameau as Robert
Adolf Zurmühl as Regisseur Held
Alice Hechy as Lady Fox, Revuestar
Aleksander Marten
Oreste Bilancia as Direktor Pepperini
Lydia Potechina as Wirtin zum 'Blökenden Ochsen'
Max Schreck as Watson - Diener Lady Fox'

References

Bibliography

External links

1926 comedy-drama films
Films of the Weimar Republic
German silent feature films
German comedy-drama films
Films directed by Rochus Gliese
German films based on plays
German black-and-white films
Films produced by Erich Pommer
UFA GmbH films
Films with screenplays by Franz Schulz
Silent comedy-drama films
1920s German films
1920s German-language films